Mike Krack (born 18 March 1972) is a Luxembourgish motorsports engineer. He has worked at BMW Sauber F1, as the chief engineer; Porsche WEC team, as head of track engineering; and at BMW, as the Head of Engineering, Operations and Organization for Racing and Testing. He has also had stints in Formula 3 and DTM. He is currently the Team Principal of Aston Martin Formula One Team.

Early life 
Krack was born on 18 March 1972. He is Luxembourgish.

Career 
Krack started his engineering journey at BMW, in July 1998, with the role of test engineer. He left the role at the start of 2001, to join Sauber. He rose through the ranks, beginning as Data Analysis Engineer. He was promoted in December 2003 to become Felipe Massa's Race Engineer and eventually was given the role of Chief Engineer when they became BMW Sauber. Here, he worked with a young Sebastian Vettel through practice sessions, until his debut in the 2007 United States Grand Prix. Krack left BMW when they made the decision to focus on 2009, rather than Robert Kubica's title challenge in 2008.

He then had stints at Kolles & Heinz Union and Hitech, both in Formula 3. He returned to BMW as chief engineer of the DTM department in October 2010, but left at the end of 2012 to join Porsche. There, he was given the role of Head of Track Engineering for their World Endurance Championship team. While he was at Porsche, he worked closely on the 919 Hybrid, which would take one victory and four podiums.

He left in 2014, to re-join BMW again, as senior performance engineer. From 2014 to 2022, he has gone through many roles, including overseeing their Formula E, IMSA and GT programmes. In 2018, he was given the role of Head of Race & Test Engineering, Operations & Organisation.

On 14 January 2022, Krack was announced as team principal of Aston Martin Formula One Team, following the departure of Otmar Szafnauer.

References 

1972 births
Living people
Motorsport people
Formula One team principals
Formula One engineers
Aston Martin in Formula One